HMS Tipperary, launched on 5 March 1915, was Royal Navy  destroyer which was sunk in action on 1 June 1916 by the Imperial German Navy at the Battle of Jutland in World War I.

War service
Originally ordered by Chile, Tipperary and her sisters were bought by the Royal Navy at the outbreak of World War I. Initially, Tipperary served as the second flotilla leader with the 3rd Destroyer Flotilla in the Harwich Force, arriving there in June 1915. Late in that same year, she took charge of a detachment of destroyers from the 2nd Flotilla, while in March 1916, Tipperary had rejoined the Harwich Force, being attached to the Fifth Light Cruiser Squadron.

For a while during the war she was commanded by Captain (later Admiral) Sir Barry Domvile.

In May 1916 Tipperary was made the leader of the 4th Flotilla, a formation which directly supported the Grand Fleet.

Sinking
About 21:58 GMT 31 May 1916 while 4th Destroyer Flotilla was searching for the German High Seas Fleet in the North Sea in the Battle of Jutland she encountered the enemy's 7th Flotilla (destroyers). The Imperial German Naval vessels launched torpedoes at the British ships, none of which hit, and 7th Flotilla then turned away. Nicholas Jellicoe's account states that "Between 23:15 and 23:20 a lookout [on HMS Garland] ... saw what he thought were enemy ships on the starboard quarter". A few minutes later Tipperary flashed the recognition signal and was immediately lit up by the searchlights of three German battleships and three light cruisers. At about 02:00 GMT 1 June 1916 she was abandoned, and sank in the following hours due to battle damage. 150 of her crew of 197 were killed in the action, a number of the survivors were rescued from the sea by the Imperial German Navy and transported back to Germany as prisoners of war.

Stoker David Eunson described the sinking: "As we floated away on that awful night, many died of sheer exhaustion and suffering. After drifting for well nigh 5 hours we were picked up at dawn. I saw the Tipperary, a mass of flames, keel over".

Aftermath
The wrecksite is designated as a protected place under the Protection of Military Remains Act 1986.

Citations

Bibliography
 

 

 
 SI 2008/0950 Designation under the Protection of Military Remains Act 1986

External links 

 Battle of Jutland Crew Lists Project - HMS Tipperary Crew List

 

Almirante Lynch-class destroyers (1912)
Faulknor-class flotilla leaders
Ships built on the Isle of Wight
1915 ships
World War I destroyers of the United Kingdom
Maritime incidents in 1916
Ships sunk at the Battle of Jutland
Protected Wrecks of the United Kingdom